The 1903 Wisconsin Badgers football team represented the University of Wisconsin in the 1903 Western Conference football season. Led by first-year head coach Arthur Hale Curtis, the Badgers compiled an overall record of 6–3–1 with a mark of 0–3–1 in conference play, placing eighth in the Western Conference. The team's captain was Allen Abbott.

Schedule

References

Wisconsin
Wisconsin Badgers football seasons
Wisconsin Badgers football